Kim Young-jung (5 October 1929 – 22 November 2021) was a South Korean politician. A member of the Democratic Justice Party, she served in the National Assembly from 1985 to 1988 and was Minister of Political Affairs from 1988 to 1990.

References

1929 births
2021 deaths
People from Hamhung
20th-century South Korean politicians
Democratic Justice Party politicians
Members of the National Assembly (South Korea)
Women government ministers of South Korea
Female members of the National Assembly (South Korea)